The 2018 season was the Philadelphia Eagles' 86th season in the National Football League and their third under head coach Doug Pederson.

The Eagles entered the season as the defending champions of Super Bowl LII, when they defeated the previous defending Super Bowl champion New England Patriots 41–33 and attempted to become the first team since the 2004 New England Patriots to repeat as Super Bowl Champions. They opened the season with the NFL Kickoff Game on September 6, beating the Atlanta Falcons 18–12. A vast majority of their Super Bowl-winning squad from the 2017 season was retained, although some notable losses included tight end Trey Burton (who contributed to the Philly Special in the Super Bowl), defensive end Vinny Curry, and cornerback Patrick Robinson. Franchise quarterback Carson Wentz, who had been injured late in the 2017 season, returned as a starter in Week 3, but a back injury would bump him down as the number 3 quarterback instead of being placed on injured reserve, and Nick Foles would start in his place for the remainder of the season.

The Eagles struggled through the first three months of the season to a 4–6 record, with inconsistent play and multiple injuries to players such as safety Rodney McLeod and running back Jay Ajayi. With a 21–17 loss to the Carolina Panthers in Week 7, the Eagles failed to improve or match their record from the previous season. The Eagles also made history in Week 11 with a 48–7 loss in New Orleans, the largest loss by a defending Super Bowl champion in league history.  Despite this, the Eagles proceeded to win 5 of their last 6 games, including two division wins over the New York Giants and the Washington Redskins to move to 9–7. A three-game win streak to end the season which included upset wins over the Rams, Texans, and Redskins helped the Eagles make the playoffs with a Vikings loss to the Bears. This is the first time the Eagles made the playoffs in back to back seasons since the 2008–10 seasons.

The Eagles played in their first NFL Kickoff Game and their first game at London's Wembley Stadium in franchise history.

In the playoffs, the Eagles upset the third-seeded Chicago Bears 16–15 in the Wild Card round to advance to the Divisional round, where they lost 14–20 to the top-seeded New Orleans Saints, ending their hopes of defending their Super Bowl title. The Eagles were the first defending champions to win a postseason game on the road since the 2004 Patriots.

Roster changes

Free agents

Signings

Departures

Trades
 March 14: The Eagles traded WR Marcus Johnson and a fifth-round draft pick in the 2018 NFL Draft to the Seattle Seahawks for DE Michael Bennett and a 7th-round draft pick.
 March 14: The Eagles traded WR Torrey Smith to the Carolina Panthers for CB Daryl Worley.
 October 30: The Eagles traded a 2019 third-round pick to the Detroit Lions for WR Golden Tate.

Draft

Draft trades
 The Eagles traded their second-round selection (64th overall), first-, third- and fourth-round selections in 2016 (8th, 77th and 100th overall), and their first-round selection in 2017 (12th overall) to Cleveland in exchange for Cleveland's first-round selection in 2016 (2nd overall) and a fourth-round selection in 2017 (139th overall).
 The Eagles traded their third-round selection (96th overall) and wide receiver Jordan Matthews to Buffalo in exchange for cornerback Ronald Darby.
 The Eagles traded quarterback Sam Bradford to Minnesota in exchange for Minnesota's fourth-round selection (130th overall) and a first-round selection in 2017 (14th overall).
 The Eagles traded cornerback Eric Rowe to New England in exchange for a conditional fourth-round selection (131st overall).
 The Eagles traded a fourth-round selection (131st overall) to Miami in exchange for running back Jay Ajayi.
 The Eagles traded their seventh-round selection (250th overall) and offensive tackle Matt Tobin to Seattle in exchange for Seattle's fifth-round selection (156th overall). The two sides later returned these selections to each other with the trade of Michael Bennett
 The Eagles traded their first-round selection (32nd overall), and their fourth-round selection (132nd overall) to the Baltimore Ravens in exchange for a 2nd-round draft pick (52nd overall), a fourth-round pick (125th overall), and a 2nd-round pick in the 2019 NFL Draft.
 The Eagles traded their second-round selection (52nd overall) and their fifth-round selection (169th overall) to the Baltimore Ravens in exchange for a second-round draft pick (49th overall).

Staff

Roster

Preseason

Regular season

Schedule
On January 11, the NFL announced that the Eagles will play the Jacksonville Jaguars in one of the London Games at Wembley Stadium in London, England, with the Jaguars serving as the home team. It will be the Eagles' first appearance in the International Series. The game would occur during Week 8 (October 28), and will be televised in the United States. The exact date, along with network and kickoff time, were announced in conjunction with the release of the  regular season schedule.

Note: Intra-division opponents are in bold text.

Game summaries

Week 1: vs. Atlanta Falcons
NFL Kickoff Game

The Eagles kicked off the 2018 season hosting Matt Ryan and the Atlanta Falcons in a rematch of last year's Divisional Round. The Falcons struggles in the red zone continued as they were stopped on fourth and goal on their first drive. The Eagles, however, had struggles of their own being held scoreless until midway through the second when Jake Elliott kicked a 26-yard field goal to tie the game. The Falcons responded with a Matt Bryant field goal to take a 6–3 lead at the half. The Eagles offense finally found life midway through the third in a remake of the Philly Special with the reigning Super Bowl MVP Nick Foles catching a pass from Nelson Agholor on a trick play. A 1-yard TD run by Jay Ajayi gave the Eagles their first lead of the night. A couple of drives later, the Eagles defense came up big again with a Rasul Douglas interception that ended a potential scoring drive for the Falcons. However, Foles (who struggled for most of the game) return the favor after throwing an interception to Deion Jones. Atlanta took advantage and scored on a 9-yard TD run by Tevin Coleman to give them a 12–10 lead (Bryant missed the extra point). The Eagles scored with under 3 minutes left on an 11-yard TD run by Ajayi and converted a two-point conversion to take a 6-point, 18–12 lead. Ryan and the Falcons had one more shot to win the game but in a repeat of last year's playoff matchup, the game came down to the final play with the Eagles stopping the Falcons on five consecutive plays, with the last being an incomplete pass from Matt Ryan to Julio Jones.

The Eagles won a nailbiter and open the season with a 1–0 record for the seventh time in their last nine openers dating back to 2010. Despite the defense's outstanding game, the offense struggled mightily. Foles finished 19/34 for just 117 yards and the latter interception. Atlanta and Philadelphia combined for 26 penalties by the end of regulation.

Week 2: at Tampa Bay Buccaneers

The Eagles traveled to Tampa Bay for Game 2 of the 2018 season. The Eagles defense struggled throughout most of the game as Ryan Fitzpatrick threw for 400+ yards and four TDs for the second consecutive week. The Eagles late comeback attempt fell short after the Bucs offense converted on a 3rd-and-3 aided by a penalty en route to a 27–21 loss. Cornerback Jalen Mills was heavily criticized after his poor performance which included allowing a 75-yard TD to DeSean Jackson on the first play of regulation.

The loss dropped the Eagles to 1–1.

Week 3: vs. Indianapolis Colts

Carson Wentz made his 2018 debut returning from a torn ACL he had suffered during Week 14 of the 2017 season in this game against the Colts. The Eagles offense struggled after the first drive, but the defense played well, holding Colts quarterback Andrew Luck to under 100 passing yards until late in the fourth quarter. Wentz led the offense to an 11-minute drive in the fourth quarter (aided by penalties) which resulted in running back Wendell Smallwood rushing for a touchdown to take the lead with 3 minutes left. The Colts got into the red zone but failed to score or at least get a first down. The final play came down to Jacoby Brissett attempting a Hail Mary that ended up barricaded in the end zone.

The win earned the Eagles a 2–1 record, tying with the Redskins for first in the NFC East.

Week 4: at Tennessee Titans

The Eagles played sparingly well for the first three-quarters holding Tennessee to just a field goal. Wentz threw for two TDs including one to Alshon Jeffery who made his 2018 debut after an offseason surgery which kept him out for the first three weeks. However, the Eagles broke down completely in the fourth allowing Marcus Mariota and the Titans to comeback and take a 20–17 late in the fourth. A 42-yard punt return by DeAndre Carter set up a 30-yard field goal by Jake Elliott tied the game leading to overtime. Elliott kicked a 37-yarder to give the Eagles the lead in overtime. The defense was unable to stop the Titans offense allowing a 4th-and-15 conversion. The drive ended with Mariota throwing a 10-yard TD to Corey Davis. The loss proved to be humiliating for the Eagles. Wentz in his second game back went 33/50 for 348 yards and two TDs. A defense decimated by injuries were once again criticized heavily for the loss.

The loss dropped the Eagles to 2–2, tied for second place with the Cowboys.

Week 5: vs. Minnesota Vikings

In a rematch of last year's Conference Championship game, the Eagles dropped their second straight game of the season to Minnesota 23–21. A slow start aided with poor defensive play costed the Eagles as their rally attempt fell short.

With this loss, the Eagles matched their loss total from 2017. There were multiple plays that proved critical to the outcome, including a controversial roughing-the-passer call on Michael Bennett at the end of the first half that continued a touchdown-scoring drive, and a third-quarter Jay Ajayi fumble near the goal line. They were also flagged 3 times for illegal formation penalties, and Carson Wentz was flagged for intentional grounding that cost the Eagles an opportunity to kick a field goal with 9:33 left in the 4th quarter.

The loss dropped the Eagles to 2–3, still tied for second place since Dallas lost later to the Texans in overtime.

Week 6: at New York Giants

What was considered a must win game, the Eagles looked dominant and never looked back. The game started off with linebacker Kamu Grugier-Hill intercepting Eli Manning setting up a Wentz TD pass to Alshon Jeffery. The Giants responded with a field goal making it 7–3. Later in the first, a Corey Clement 1-yard TD run put the Eagles up 14–3 The Eagles shut down the Giants for the most part in the first half leading 24–6 by half time. All the Giants mustered was a 50-yard TD run by rookie Saquon Barkley. The Eagles mostly burned out time in the fourth adding more points with an Elliott 30-yard field goal to make it 34–13. The Eagles offense resembled their Super Bowl winning offense while the defense stepped up and shut down Eli Manning and Odell Beckham Jr. However, Barkley had 130 rushing yards and a TD.

With this win, the Eagles had increased their record to 3–3 and have now won four straight games over the Giants dating back to December 2016. However the Eagles remained tied second place in the division since the Cowboys and Redskins won their games.

Week 7: vs. Carolina Panthers

After a big road win, the Eagles came back home to square off against Cam Newton and the Panthers. The Eagles again looked poised to win; going up 10–0 before halftime, then going up 17–0 before the end of the 3rd Quarter. But in a much similar narrative to their Week 4 loss in Tennessee, the Eagles broke down in the fourth quarter allowing the Panthers to score 21 unanswered points; including a 2-point conversion from Cam Newton to Jarius Wright following the second of their 3 touchdowns. The offense was shut down and did not respond to Cam Newton's three TDs to Curtis Samuel, Devin Funchess and Greg Olsen. The Eagles had one more shot to win after a defensive pass interference penalty moved them deep in Panthers territory, but they didn't convert on a key fourth down, sealing yet another loss with a blown lead.

The loss dropped the Eagles to 3–4 and third in the NFC East, and allowed the Redskins to take a two-game lead in the division after they beat the Cowboys later that evening. Also with this loss, they could no longer match their win total from their Super Bowl-winning season.

Week 8: at Jacksonville Jaguars
NFL London Games

This marked the Eagles first appearance in the NFL International Series in London as they faced the Jacksonville Jaguars who were also struggling after a strong 2017 campaign. After two turnovers on their first two processions, the Eagles offense played well. Wentz had another strong game after facing criticism after last week, throwing for three TDs. Rookie tight end Dallas Goedert scored a TD for the second straight week and his third in his career. The defense managed to stop the Jaguars on their last drive to prevent a game winning drive. The Eagles sealed the win on their last drive, making two key conversions on second down, which helped them milk out the clock.

With the close win, the Eagles headed into their bye week with a 4–4 record.

Week 9: Bye week 
During their bye week, the Eagles traded a 2019 third-round pick to the Detroit Lions for WR Golden Tate at the trade deadline. The Eagles also gained better position in the NFC East with the Redskins and Cowboys both losing their games.

Week 10: vs. Dallas Cowboys

The Eagles returned home for a crucial Sunday Night game against their bitter rivals the Dallas Cowboys who had struggled with a dismal 3–5 record. Despite being favored to dominate, they struggled in the first half trailing 13–3 at the half, and despite keeping neck and neck, never once led. After finding a spark on offense, the defense struggled to contain the Cowboys. A last second desperation drive with Zach Ertz lateraling the ball to Golden Tate ended up falling short of the end zone. With this loss, they not only dropped them to 4–5, but it also raised many concerns on whether or not if the team were still contenders. Also with the loss, they dropped to third place in the NFC East division, standing at the brink of playoff contention just 9 months after winning the Super Bowl.

Week 11: at New Orleans Saints

The Eagles entered this game with a gruesome injury list and shorthanded on defense. The Eagles struggled to get anything going on offense while the defense (which consisted of third string/practice squad players) was unable to contain Drew Brees and the Saints. The Eagles suffered a major meltdown all evening long as fans started to boil over on social media and question their defending champs inconsistent performance. Even the voice of the Eagles; Merrill Reese commented on Twitter, "What a disaster! I didn't expect the Eagles to win but I didn't expect them to be completely dominated in every respect from beginning to end. Where are they going to get corners to play against  the Giants next week ?". The Saints were too much for the Eagles as the team fell to 4–6 on the season and at the brink of the playoff picture. Carson Wentz had the worst game of his career; being held to 156 yards, no touchdowns and 3 interceptions.

Furthermore, the Eagles' loss to the Saints by 41 points is the biggest defeat for a defending Super Bowl Champion. In addition, this was their worst loss since their 42–0 defeat to the Seahawks in 2005.

This was also the Eagles' first defeat to New Orleans since the 2012 season.

Week 12: vs. New York Giants

After last week's meltdown, the Eagles returned home for round 2 against the Giants who were having an underwhelming season. The Eagles struggles continued as they fell through early facing a 19–3 deficit. However, the offense turned around and scored 22 unanswered points led by young running backs Corey Clement and rookie Josh Adams while the defense shutdown Eli Manning and held them to just 3 points in the second half. The Eagles would win with a Jake Elliott game-winning field goal completing their comeback and snapping their 3-game losing streak.

The Eagles advanced to 5–6 after what it seemed like all hope was lost.

With this win, the all-time series is tied 86–86–2. Furthermore, the Eagles have now won five straight games over the Giants dating back to December 2016 and extended their home win streak against the Giants to five games (dating back to October 2014).

Week 13: vs. Washington Redskins

After a big comeback last week, the Eagles stayed home for a Monday Night showdown against Adrian Peterson and the Redskins. The Eagles mostly dominated throughout the game although there were some self-inflicted wounds that could've costed them. The offense was solid for the most part although there were some questionable plays. The defense mostly contained the Redskins, despite allowing a 90-yard Adrian Peterson TD run. The defense knocked out veteran backup Colt McCoy (who was filling in for Alex Smith who was out for the year). Former Eagles QB Mark Sanchez came in for the Redskins. A Nathan Gerry INT setup the Eagles to essentially pull the game away with a 4-yard TD pass to Jordan Matthews.

With this win against the Redskins, the Eagles now evened their record at 6–6. They have now won three straight games over the Redskins dating back to 2017. Also with this win they won back to back games for the first time this season.

Week 14: at Dallas Cowboys

The Eagles came in feeling good about themselves as they looked to take the division. However, with a slow start, the Eagles seemed to lose life again. However, they came back and it was a back and forth battle between the two teams. While the Eagles offense got it going, the defense was unable to contain Dak Prescott and the Cowboys; who torched the Eagles with 455 yards, 192 yards from scrimmage by Ezekiel Elliott and 3 touchdowns to Amari Cooper. Eventually, the Cowboys won with an Amari Cooper TD in overtime. The loss proved to be crumbling for the Eagles as they fell back at the brink of the playoff picture. After the game, controversy filled among fans on social media blaming the officiating by the referees which affected the outcome.

With the loss, the Eagles fell to 6–7, and they were swept by the Cowboys for the first time since 2012.

Week 15: at Los Angeles Rams

After a heartbreaking loss, the Eagles came into LA wounded with injuries, including QB Carson Wentz, who was ruled out for the game. It was Nick Foles who was going to start against Jared Goff and the red hot Rams. The Eagles shocked the Rams with a 30–13 lead by the end of the third quarter. However, the Rams rallied back within one score with one last shot to send the game into overtime. The Eagles defense stalled them on their last drive and sealed the upset. The defense was praised for containing one of the NFL's top offenses while the offense was praised for its strong performance led by Foles.

With the win in Los Angeles, the Eagles climbed back to 7–7, and kept their playoff hopes alive. They entered the game as 13.5-point underdogs. Nick Foles once again came into LA and beat the Rams after taking over for an injured Carson Wentz, as he had done in 2017.

Week 16: vs. Houston Texans

The Eagles defeated the Texans after a last-second field goal attempt from Jake Elliott was successful, despite turning the ball over three times and a late rally attempt by Houston. The offense continued dominating with Foles taking down another big opponent. The defense was solid despite the late collapse that could've ended their playoff hopes.

With the win, the Eagles advanced to 8–7 with higher hopes of making the playoffs only needing a win and a Vikings loss. The Eagles now have a record of 4–1 since a 48–7 loss to the Saints.

Week 17: at Washington Redskins

The Eagles entered Week 17 needing a win over the Redskins and help from the Chicago Bears to keep their playoff hopes alive. Philadelphia dominated Washington from start to finish in a 24–0 shutout win. The offense was consistent despite losing Foles midway through the fourth quarter dominating time of possession having the ball for over 40 minutes compared to just over 15 minutes for Washington. Third string QB Nate Sudfeld sealed the win with a 22-yard TD pass to Nelson Agholor. The defense shutdown QB Josh Johnson and the Redskins who were held to just 89 total yards and 8 first downs. CB Rasul Douglas set the tone early with an INT on the first play of the game.

With the win, the Eagles finished the 2018 season with a 9–7 record. The Eagles would eventually clinch the final playoff berth when the Bears defeated the Minnesota Vikings 24–10. The Eagles made the playoffs for consecutive seasons for the first time since the 2008–2010 seasons. The Eagles became the first defending champions to qualify for the postseason as a wild card team since the 2010 Saints.

Standings

Division

Conference

Postseason

Schedule

Game summaries

NFC Wild Card Playoffs: at (3) Chicago Bears

The Eagles started their playoff run by traveling to Chicago to square off against Mitchell Trubisky and the Bears, who helped the Eagles get to the playoffs in the first place. In an intense defensive battle, the Eagles got the edge with a Golden Tate TD with just under a minute left. The Bears drove down the field, but after an upright and crossbar "Double Doink" by Bears kicker Cody Parkey (also a former Eagles kicker), the Eagles narrowly escaped the Windy City with a 16–15 win and advanced to New Orleans for a rematch.

The Eagles won their first road playoff game since 2008.

NFC Divisional Playoffs: at (1) New Orleans Saints

The Eagles traveled to New Orleans to face the Saints in a rematch of the Week 11 game which ended in a 48–7 rout in the Saints' favor. Despite jumping out to an early 14–0 first-quarter lead over the top-seeded Saints on touchdowns by Jordan Matthews and Nick Foles, the Eagles could not keep up the pace. New Orleans responded with 20 unanswered points over the final three-quarters, including the eventual game-winning third-quarter touchdown pass from Drew Brees to Michael Thomas, to defeat the Eagles 20–14 and end Philadelphia's reign as Super Bowl Champions. The loss was just the second career postseason loss for Foles, the other being a 26–24 loss in the 2013 season, also to the Saints. New Orleans' victory over Philadelphia meant that, for the 14th straight season, a new Super Bowl champion would be crowned.

References

External links
 

Philadelphia
Philadelphia Eagles seasons
Philadelphia Eagles